Rioverde may refer to the following places:

 Rioverde, Ecuador
 Rioverde, San Luis Potosí